Mathilda Charlotta Berwald, née Cohn (9 March 1798 in Helsinki in Finland – 3 May 1877 in Stockholm), was a Finnish and Swedish concert singer. She was later appointed official singer (Hovsångare) of the Swedish royal court.

She married the Swedish concert musician Johan Fredrik Berwald in 1817. She toured with her husband and performed as a singer at his concerts. She educated her three daughters Fredrique, Julie Mathilda and Hedvig Eleonora as singers. She performed with her husband and Fredrique at the Opera in Berlin for Spontini, and then for the Royal Danish family, in 1833. In 1834, she was given the title of first singer of the royal Swedish court. They toured in Finland (1842), Denmark (1844) and had a great success in Berlin (1847).

See also 
 Lovisa Augusti

Notes

References 
 Johan Leonard Höijers Musik-Lexikon 1864
 Sten Broman: Franz Berwalds stamträd (1968) i Svensk tidskrift för musikforskning
 Svenskt biografiskt handlexikon (1906) Herman Hofberg

1798 births
1877 deaths
19th-century Finnish women singers
19th-century Swedish women singers
Jewish women singers
Finnish Jews
Singers from Helsinki
19th-century Jews